The John R. Barber House, near Springfield, Kentucky, was built in about 1904 or 1905. It was listed on the National Register of Historic Places in 1989.

The house is a two-story brick structure on a limestone foundation.  It has a hipped roof with a jerkinhead.

The Matthew Walton Law Office, separately NRHP-listed in 1977, is adjacent to the property.

References

Houses on the National Register of Historic Places in Kentucky
Colonial Revival architecture in Kentucky
Houses completed in 1905
National Register of Historic Places in Washington County, Kentucky
1905 establishments in Kentucky
Houses in Washington County, Kentucky